Acrocarpospora is a genus in the phylum Actinomycetota (Bacteria). The major respiratory quinone is menaquinone MK-9(H(4)) and use madurose, an actinomycete whole-cell sugar.

Etymology
The name Acrocarpospora derives from:Greek adjective akros, uttermost, topmost, highest, at the top, end; Greek noun karpos, fruit; Greek feminine gender noun spora, a seed, and in biology a spore; New Latin feminine gender noun Acrocarpospora, an organism forming spores like fruits on the terminal mycelium.

Species
The genus contains 3 species (including basonyms and synonyms), namely
 A. corrugata ( (Williams and Sharples 1976) Tamura et al. 2000; Latin feminine gender participle adjective , ridged (spores).)
 A. macrocephala ( Tamura et al. 2000; Greek adjective , long-headed; New Latin feminine gender noun , large head.)
 A. pleiomorpha ( Tamura et al. 2000,  (Type species of the genus).; Greek adjective , full; Greek noun , form, shape; New Latin feminine gender adjective , pleiomorphic, in various shapes.)

See also
 Bacterial taxonomy
 Microbiology

References 

Bacteria genera
Actinomycetales